Agalychnis dacnicolor, the Mexican leaf frog, is a species of frog in the subfamily Phyllomedusinae. It is endemic to Mexico.

The adult grows up to 100 mm in length, with an overall dorsal colour of green with scattered white spots. The underbelly is white with legs and digits of orange. This species has enlarged toes and golden eyes, and females are larger than males. They eat mainly insects and are nocturnal, spending the day in sheltered burrows or under stones or logs.

Its natural habitats are subtropical or tropical dry forests, intermittent rivers, intermittent freshwater marshes, water storage areas, and ponds. It is not considered a threatened species by the IUCN.

Breeding takes place near ponds and swamps. The eggs are laid in clumps above the water on foliage. The tadpoles fall into the water after hatching.

References

External links
 The Mexican leaf frog at vivanatura.org
 The Mexican leaf frog or Mexican dumpy at frogs.cc

dacnicolor
Amphibians described in 1864
Taxonomy articles created by Polbot